Jennings Township is the name of four townships in the U.S. state of Indiana:

 Jennings Township, Crawford County, Indiana
 Jennings Township, Fayette County, Indiana
 Jennings Township, Owen County, Indiana
 Jennings Township, Scott County, Indiana

Indiana township disambiguation pages